The Cyp11b3 is a rat gene encoding a CYP450 enzyme, which is mainly expressed in neonatal rat adrenals, and also expressed in a small amount in other organs of adult rats, this enzyme mainly catalyzing 11-Deoxycorticosterone (DOC) to 18-Hydroxy-11-deoxycorticosterone (18-OH-DOC).
Cyp11b3 gene is also located at Chromosome 7q34, next to rat CYP11B1 and CYP11B2.

References 

11
rat